Lamproblattidae is a small family of South and Central American cockroaches in the order Blattodea. It consists of three genera and 10 species:

Eurycanthablatta Fritzsche & Zompro, 2008
 E. pugionata Fritzsche & Zompro, 2008: Brazil
Lamproblatta Hebard, 1919
 L. albipalpus Hebard, 1919: Panama; Colombia; Brazil (Amapá)
 L. ancistroides Rehn, 1930: Colombia; Venezuela
 L. flavomaculata Princis, 1946: Colombia
 L. gorgonis Rehn, 1930: Colombia (Gorgona Island)
 L. meridionalis (Bruner, 1906): Republic of Trinidad and Tobago (Trinidad)
 L. mimetes Rehn, 1930: Brazil (Mato Grosso)
 L. romani Rehn, 1930: Brazil (Amazonas)
 L. zamorensis (Giglio-Tos, 1898): Ecuador; Peru
Lamproglandifera Roth, 2003
 L. flavoglandis Roth, 2003: Brazil

References 

Cockroach families